The 1989 All-Ireland Senior Football Championship was the 103rd staging of the All-Ireland Senior Football Championship, the Gaelic Athletic Association's premier inter-county Gaelic football tournament. The championship began on 14 May 1989 and ended on 17 September 1989.

Meath were the defending champions, however, they were defeated by Dublin in the Leinster final.

On 17 September 1989, Cork won the championship following a 0-17 to 1-11 defeat of Mayo in the All-Ireland final. This was their 5th All-Ireland title, their first in sixteen championship seasons.

Mayo's Michael Fitzmaurice was the championship's top scorer with 0-32. Cork's Teddy McCarthy was the choice for Texaco Footballer of the Year.

Results

Connacht Senior Football Championship

Quarter-finals

Semi-finals

 

Finals

Leinster Senior Football Championship

First round

Quarter-finals

 

Semi-finals

Final

Munster Senior Football Championship

Quarter-finals

Semi-finals

   

Final

Ulster Senior Football Championship

Preliminary round

Quarter-finals

  
  

Semi-finals

  

Finals

All-Ireland Senior Football Championship

Semi-finals

Final

Championship statistics

Miscellaneous

 On 11 June 1989, Corran Park in Ballymote hosts its first championship game in 36 years. That defeat of Leitrim by Sligo is their first championship victory over the team in 15 years.
 Cork win the Munster title for the third year in succession. It is the first time in their history that they achieve the three-in-a-row.
 The All Ireland semi-finals the Mayo vs Tyrone game was the first championship meeting between the teams while the other had between Cork vs Dublin was Cork's first championship win over Dublin.
 The All-Ireland final between Cork and Mayo is their first championship meeting since the 1916 All-Ireland semi-final. It is Mayo's first appearance in an All-Ireland final in 38 years.

Top scorers

Overall

Single game

References